The Stickpin is a 1933 British crime film directed by Leslie S. Hiscott and starring Henry Kendall, Betty Astell and Francis L. Sullivan.

It was made as a quota quickie at Beaconsfield Studios.
The film's sets were designed by Norman G. Arnold.

Premise
A man is framed for killing the blackmailer of his friend's wife.

Cast
 Henry Kendall as Paul Rayner
 Betty Astell as Eve Marshall
 Francis L. Sullivan as Jacob Volke
 Lawrence Anderson as Tom Marshall
 Henry Caine as Dixon
 F. Pope-Stamper as Simms

References

Bibliography
 Chibnall, Steve. Quota Quickies: The Birth of the British 'B' Film. British Film Institute, 2007.
 Low, Rachael. Filmmaking in 1930s Britain. George Allen & Unwin, 1985.
 Wood, Linda. British Films, 1927-1939. British Film Institute, 1986.

External links
 

1933 films
1933 crime drama films
1930s English-language films
Films directed by Leslie S. Hiscott
British crime drama films
Films shot at Beaconsfield Studios
Quota quickies
British black-and-white films
1930s British films